Shweta Deepak Bishnoi (born 12 August 1992 at Hanumangarh, Rajasthan) is a Rajasthani cricketer. She is a right-handed batsman and bowls right-arm medium pace. She played for Rajasthan, Madhya Pradesh and Central zone. She has played 2 First-class, 33 List A and 29 Women's Twenty20 matches. She made her debut in major domestic cricket in a one-day match on 12 October 2007 against Vidarbha.

References 

1992 births
Rajasthan women cricketers
Madhya Pradesh women cricketers
Central Zone women cricketers
Living people
People from Hanumangarh district